Sizwe Mabizela is a South African mathematician who became vice-chancellor of Rhodes University in 2014. He previously served as deputy vice-chancellor: academic and student affairs.

References

Living people
Academic staff of Rhodes University
1962 births
Vice-Chancellors of Rhodes University